Mikel Nieve Iturralde (born 26 May 1984) is a Spanish former professional road bicycle racer, who competed as a professional from 2008 to 2022.

Career

Euskaltel–Euskadi (2009–2013)

Born in Leitza, Nieve won the sixteenth stage of the 2010 Vuelta a España, shaking off four riders to win solo in the mountain finish at the Alto de Cotobello. He earned another prestigious victory in the fifteenth stage of the 2011 Giro d'Italia, the queen stage of that year's edition, which Alberto Contador later described as the most difficult stage of his life. Nieve had broken away early, and crested the penultimate climb of the day, the Passo Fedaia, with only Stefano Garzelli in front of him. On the lower slope of the final climb to Gardeccia-Val di Fassa, Nieve passed Garzelli, and held on to win the stage after having spent a little less than 7 hours and a half in the saddle.

He finished 10th twice in the Giro d'Italia in 2011 and 2012. He also finished 10th twice in the Vuelta a España in 2010 and 2011.

In 2013, Nieve rode his first Tour de France, where he finished 3rd on Mont Ventoux and 9th on Alpe d'Huez. He ended up finishing 12th overall. After the disbanding of the  team was confirmed at the end of the 2013 season, Nieve agreed to join  on an initial two-year deal.

Team Sky (2014–2017) 
In 2014, he won stage 8, the final stage of the Critérium du Dauphiné as well as finishing 8th overall.

In 2015, Nieve finished 8th overall in the Vuelta a España, his highest Grand Tour finish to date.

In 2016, Nieve won stage 13 of the Giro d'Italia. He also went on to win the mountains classification. Nieve also rode the Tour de France, where he helped Chris Froome take overall victory as one of his mountain domestiques.

Mitchelton–Scott (2018–2021) 
In August 2017, it was announced that Nieve would join  for the 2018 season. During the 2018 Giro d'Italia, Nieve won the penultimate stage of the race, having been a part of the 27-rider breakaway on his 34th birthday. He finished 10th overall in the 2019 Vuelta a España, finishing in the top 10 of the race for the fourth time in his career, having entered the race as a domestique for teammate Esteban Chaves. At the 2020 Tour de France, he abandoned a Grand Tour for the first time in 19 attempts, having finished each of the previous 18 in the top-25 placings overall. He then rode the 2020 Vuelta a España, and finished 13th overall.

Caja Rural–Seguros RGA
In December 2021, Nieve announced that he was joining the  team for the 2022 season, after thirteen years at UCI World Tour level.

Major results

2007
 9th Overall Vuelta a Navarra
2008
 3rd Overall Cinturó de l'Empordà
2009
 7th Overall Vuelta a Mallorca
7th Trofeo Inca
2010
 4th Trofeo Inca
 7th Giro di Lombardia
 10th Overall Vuelta a España
1st Stage 16
2011
 8th Gran Premio de Llodio
 10th Overall Giro d'Italia
1st Stage 15
 10th Overall Vuelta a España
 10th Overall Vuelta a Burgos
2012
 5th Overall Tour de Suisse
 10th Overall Giro d'Italia
2013
 4th Clásica de San Sebastián
2014
 4th Clásica de San Sebastián
 8th Overall Critérium du Dauphiné
1st Stage 8
 10th Overall Tirreno–Adriatico
  Combativity award Stage 18 Tour de France
2015
 2nd Overall Tour of Slovenia
 4th Overall Vuelta a Andalucía
 6th Giro di Lombardia
 8th Overall Vuelta a España
 10th Overall Tour de Pologne
2016
 Giro d'Italia
1st  Mountains classification
1st Stage 13
 10th Overall Vuelta a Andalucía
2017
 8th Giro di Lombardia
 9th Overall Tour de Suisse
2018
 1st Stage 20 Giro d'Italia
2019
 4th GP Miguel Induráin
 8th Overall Tour of the Basque Country
 10th Overall Vuelta a España
2020 
 9th Overall Tour de Pologne
 10th Overall Vuelta a Burgos
2022
 10th Overall Troféu Joaquim Agostinho

Grand Tour general classification results timeline

References

External links 

 Mikel Nieve profile at Team Sky
 

1984 births
Living people
Cyclists from Navarre
Spanish male cyclists
Spanish Vuelta a España stage winners
Spanish Giro d'Italia stage winners
People from Norte de Aralar